Mechanical Lloyd Company Limited is an Accra-based company engaged in automobile and farm equipment sales and service. They are listed on the stock index of the Ghana Stock Exchange, the GSE All-Share Index. Mechanical Lloyd was incorporated on 7 August 1970 and was listed on the stock exchange on 10 May 1994.

The company has three vehicle sales divisions, covering Ford, BMW, and Massey Ferguson vehicles, and a fourth service division.

References

External links
Mechanical Lloyd Official website
 BMW-Ghana Official website
Mechanical Lloyd at Alacrastore

Retail companies established in 1970
Companies listed on the Ghana Stock Exchange
Automotive companies of Ghana
1970 establishments in Ghana
Companies based in Accra